Mor Wade (born 15 March 1957) is a Senegalese wrestler. He competed in the men's freestyle 130 kg at the 1992 Summer Olympics.

References

1957 births
Living people
Senegalese male sport wrestlers
Olympic wrestlers of Senegal
Wrestlers at the 1992 Summer Olympics
Place of birth missing (living people)